Telosma cordata  is a species of flowering plant, native to China and Indo-China, in the family Apocynaceae (tribe Marsdenieae). It is cultivated elsewhere and may occur wild as an introduced species. Common names include Chinese violet, cowslip creeper, Pakalana vine, Tonkin jasmine and Tonkinese creeper. The plant bears clusters of golden yellow blooms along the vining stems during summer months. Individual blooms emerge successively over a period of weeks emitting a rich, heavy fragrance during the day and night.

Characteristics
Telosma cordata is classified as a creeper that can climb as far as 2–5 meters. The vine is small, round and very tough; it is  considered poisonous for pigs. As the tree is older, the vine will change from green to brown. The top is covered with dense white bush that can cover other trees completely. The plant can be reproduced by cutting or seeding and grows in airy soil in bright sunlight. It can be found in evergreen, mixed deciduous forests, grove woods and dry forests all over Indo-China.

Leaf
Telosma cordata has single heart-shaped leaves growing in pairs. The leaf is about 4–7.5 cm wide and about 6–11 cm long with smooth underside. The leaf is very thin, with veins that can be clearly seen. The stem is about 1.2–2 cm long.

Flower

The flowers bloom as a bouquet consisting of about 10–20 flowers. The greenish-yellow flower has a strong fragrance especially in the evening. It has a diameter of about 1.5 cm with 5 petals and 5 stamens which are connected to each other and to the pistils. The blooming season is usually March–May, although sometimes flowers can be found in July–October.

Fruit
The fruit is smooth, green and round with pointed ends. The interior contains many flat seeds with white fluff attached to the ends. The produce season is around June–August.

Uses

The top, fruit and flowers can all be consumed as vegetables. The top is believed to be the most nutritious part. The flower is used in desserts and for ornamental purposes in bouquets and wreaths. The plant's vines are tough and can be used as ropes. The wood can be used for construction in some cases. The plant has also been used for traditional medicinal purposes, as an antipyretic, an antidote for poison, a tranquilizer, and for the relief of backbone pain.

Nutritional value per 100 g

See also
Telosma procumbens

References

External links

Glass-noodles with Shrimps and Pakalana Flowers
 ขจร สรรพคุณและประโยชน์ของดอกขจร 24 ข้อ ! (ผักสลิด,ดอกสลิด). 2016. ขจร สรรพคุณและ ประโยชน์ของดอกขจร 24 ข้อ ! (ผักสลิด,ดอกสลิด). [ONLINE] Available at: http://frynn.com/ขจร/. [Accessed 2 February 2016].

Asclepiadoideae
Thai cuisine
Vietnamese cuisine
Inflorescence vegetables
Flora of China
Plants described in 1768
Taxa named by Nicolaas Laurens Burman